The Cohen Baronetcy, of Highfield in the Parish of Shoreham and County of Kent, was a title in the Baronetage of the United Kingdom. It was created on 19 December 1905 for the businessman and Conservative politician Benjamin Cohen. The title became extinct on the death of the second Baronet in 1968.

Cohen baronets, of Highfield (1905)
Sir Benjamin Louis Cohen, 1st Baronet (1844–1909)
Sir Herbert Benjamin Cohen, 2nd Baronet (1874–1968)

See also
Waley-Cohen baronets

References

Extinct baronetcies in the Baronetage of the United Kingdom